The Karachi Zoo, also known as Karachi Zoological and Botanical Gardens, formerly known as Gandhi Garden, is located in Garden West, Karachi, Sindh, Pakistan. Established in 1799, it is the largest zoo of Pakistan and second oldest zoo in the country after Lahore Zoo.

History

Karachi Zoo, established in year 1878, was commonly called as 'Mahatma Gandhi Garden'. Earlier in 1861, the zoo was transferred to municipality by the British Indian government. In 1878, the municipality placed the zoo under a trust to be developed out of public subscription. Later, the zoo was once again opened to public in 1881. After the independence of Pakistan in 1947, the name was changed to 'Karachi Zoological Gardens' or 'Karachi Zoo' for short. In 1953, Karachi Metropolitan Corporation introduced a zoo curator and a qualified veterinary doctor. In 1991-2, City District Government Karachi (CDGK) planned for remodelling of Natural History Museum, which was carried out. In 1992, the Japanese Princess inaugurated the remodeled Natural History Museum. In 2008, total employees of Karachi Zoo was about 240 staff members.

Areas and attractions
Elephant House is the most famous exhibit in the zoo. A 65-year-old Asian elephant, named 'Anarkali', died on 19 July 2006. Two female African bush elephants arrived at the zoo on 16 May 2010 from Karachi Safari Park. Both were born in Tanzania in 2007 and have been named 'Noor Jahan' and 'Madhu Bala'.
Natural History Museum, renovated in 1992, is one of the more famous attractions in Karachi Zoo. Apart from stuffed animals, skins, antlers, horns and feathers etc. are also placed on display in the museum. The facility is used by zoology students for research and educational purposes.
Reptile House was extended and renovated in 1992. It is one of the few reptile houses in Pakistan. There are 13 species of snakes and lizards. Newly born hatchlings of testudines and crocodilians are also exhibited.
Veterinary Hospital was established in 1998 in Karachi Zoo with modern diagnostic facilities. There is an operation theatre, equipped with X-ray and sonogram facilities, multiple sick bays, a laboratory and an incubation room.
Mughal Garden, established in 1970, has green lawns with seasonal plants that occupy a major part of the garden accompanied with Mughal-style fountains. The garden is famous for different varieties of roses and other flowers that are exhibited there.
White Lions, purchased in 2012 and a big draw for the zoo, are a part of a breeding programme.

Karachi Municipal Aquarium
Karachi Municipal Aquarium was constructed in 1953. Located inside the Karachi Zoo, the aquarium has a total of 28 tanks which contain a total of around 300 fishes of about 30 species. It is one of the three public aquaria in Karachi, the other two being Clifton Fish Aquarium and Landhi Korangi Aquarium.

Controversies and criticism
The treatment and conditions of the animals in the zoo has been criticized in the Pakistani media.

Another reason Karachi Zoo has developed a negative reputation is because of multiple deaths of resident species of Arabian oryx, classified as critically endangered by IUCN. A pair was bought from a private farm in 2007. The female gave birth to a female in 2007 and later, to a male and a female in 2008, both of which died in 2009. The first-born oryx gave birth on March 12, 2010 to another calf, who died the following day. Four days later, the mother of the calf also died in the zoo hospital. At that point, the zoo was left with the original pair from 2007. On March 23, 2010, the female of the pair, who was being treated for a foot injury at the zoo hospital for a week also died.

In April 2016, a 16-year-old Bengal tiger named Alex died in the zoo due to kidney failure while being diagnosed. Now the zoo is left with only one female tiger named Rachel. The zoo made a request to the government for a new male tiger for the zoo. Earlier the same month the zoo lost three young Blackbucks in a fight within the enclosure during the night as the zookeepers are only present in daytime. There was no one to take care of the animals when the incident happened.
Three newborn Puma cubs have also died in the zoo.

New Arrivals
On 15 March 2017, two new bears were welcomed to the zoo, a male Asian black bear and a female Syrian brown bear.

Species list

Aves
Black crowned crane
Common pheasant
Greater flamingo
Green peafowl
Indian peafowl
Mute swan
Ring-necked parakeet
Rock pigeon

Mammals
Arabian oryx
Asiatic black bear
African bush elephant
Bactrian camel
Bengal tiger
Black buck
Chital (spotted deer)
Fallow deer
Giraffe
Hog deer
Indian crested porcupine
Indian wolf (Indian jackal)
Lion
Llama
Mouflon (sub. urial)
Nilgai
Olive baboon
Plains zebra
Red deer
Sika deer
Spotted hyena
Wild goat (sub. Sindh ibex)

Reptiles
Gharial
Indian cobra
Indian sand boa
Mugger crocodile
Oriental ratsnake
Spur-thighed tortoise

Picture gallery

See also
List of zoos in Pakistan
List of parks and gardens in Pakistan
List of parks and gardens in Karachi

References

External links

Zoos in Pakistan
Parks in Karachi
Tourist attractions in Karachi
Zoos established in 1878
1878 establishments in Asia